Dakahlia Governorate is an Egyptian governorate lying northeast of Cairo. Its area is approximately 3,500 km2. Although the capital of the governorate is Mansoura, it got its name from the ancient town of Daqahlah (from ) which is located in the modern Damietta Governorate.

History

Archaeology 
According to the Egypt's Ministry of Antiquities, in February, 2020, Egyptian archaeologists have uncovered 83 tombs dating back to 4,000 B.C known as Naqada III period. Various small pottery pots in different shapes and some sea shells, makeup tools, eyeliner pots, and jewels were also revealed in the burial.

In April 2021, Egyptian archeologists announced the discovery of 110 burial tombs at the Koum el-Khulgan archeological site. 68 oval-shaped tombs of them dated back to the Predynastic Period and 37 rectangular-shaped tombs were from Second Intermediate Period. Rest of them dated back to the Naqada III period. The tombs also contained the remains of adults and a baby (buried in a jar), a group of ovens, stoves, remnants of mud-brick foundations, funerary equipment, cylindrical, pear-shaped vessels and a bowl with geometric designs.

Municipal divisions
The governorate is divided into the following municipal divisions and in July 2017 had an estimated population of 6,516,489. At times there is a kism and a markaz with the same name.

Population
According to population estimates, in 2015 the majority of residents in the governorate lived in rural areas, with an urbanization rate of 28.2%. Out of an estimated 5,949,001 people residing in the governorate, 4,271,428 people lived in rural areas as opposed to 1,677,573 in urban areas. By 2018, the population had increased to an estimated 6,577,000.

Overview
The Urology and Nephrology Center of Mansoura University  Faculty of Medicine also features a renowned kidney center. 
Founded in 1983. Under the management of Dr. Mohamed A. Ghoneim.

Cities and towns
Aga
Bilqas
Damas
Dikirnis
El Gamaliya
El Kurdi
El Matareya
El Senbellawein
Gamasa
Gogar
Mansoura
Manzala
Mit Elkorama
Mit Ghamr
Mit Salsil
Nabaroh
Sherbin
Temay El Amdeed
Talkha

Industrial zones
According to the Egyptian Governing Authority for Investment and Free Zones (GAFI), in affiliation with the Ministry of Investment (MOI), the following industrial zones are located in this governorate:
Southwest Gamasa 
Asafra

Notable people

Arts
Ahmad Hasan al-Zayyat, writer and intellectual
Anis Mansour, writer
Ali Mahmoud Taha, romantic poet
Adel Emam, movie and stage actor
Faten Hamama, actress and producer
Hassan al-Imam, film director
Iman Mersal, poet
Khaled El Nabawy, actor
Mohamed Abla, artist
Mahmoud Mokhtar, sculptor
Naguib Surur, poet and playwright
No'man Ashour, poet and playwright
Ramy Essam, musician
Sherif Mounir, movie and stage actor
Umm Kulthum, renowned singer and songwriter

Journalists
Ahmed Mansour (journalist)
Mohamed Makhzangi, journalist and writer
Mohammed Hussein Heikal, journalist, writer and politician
Magdi Mehanna

Politics
Ali Pasha Mubarak, one of the most influential and talented of Egypt's 19th century reformers
Ayman Nour, politician
Ahmed Gamal El-Din Moussa, former minister
Ahmed Lutfi el-Sayed, intellectual, secularist and nationalist
Abdel Latif Boghdadi, politician
Khaled Ali, lawyer and Acitvist
Khairat el-Shater, Islamic political activist
Mohammed Mahdi Akef, former head of Muslim Brotherhood
Mohamed Abdul Salam Mahgoub, politician
Omar Abdel-Rahman, Muslim leader and activist
Sami Hafez Anan, military officer
Salah Nasr, former intelligence agency director

Religion
Gad el-Haq, former Grand Imam of Al-Azhar
George El Mozahem, Coptic Orthodox martyr and saint
Mohamed Metwally Al-Shaarawy, Islamic scholar
Mahmoud Zakzouk, academic and politician

Science
Farouk El-Baz, space scientist
Mohamed Ghoneim, urologist
Saad Eddin Ibrahim, academic and sociologist
Selim Hassan, Egyptologist

Sports
Ōsunaarashi Kintarō (Abdelrahman Shalan) sumo wrestler
Abdel-Zaher El-Saqqa, footballer
Amr Marey, footballer
Hussam El-Badrawi, sports shooter
Mahmoud Fathalla, footballer
Mahmoud El Khatib, footballer
Mahmoud Abou El-Saoud, footballer
Mohamed El Shamy (footballer, born 1996)
Mimi El-Sherbini, footballer
Salah Soliman, footballer

References

External links

Dakahliya Governorate Official website
Dakahlia page
 El Wattan News of Dakahlia Governorate

 
Governorates of Egypt
Cities in Egypt
Medieval cities of Egypt
Metropolitan areas of Egypt